Montessa Tairakena (born 12 September 2000) is a New Zealand rugby sevens player.

Tairakena attended Hamilton Girls' High School and was a member of the Youth Olympic Games Sevens team that won gold in 2018. She made her international Black Ferns Sevens debut at the 2019 USA Women's Sevens in Glendale, Colorado.

Tairakena has also represented New Zealand in athletics and touch rugby.

References

External links 

 Black Ferns Profile

2000 births
Living people
New Zealand female rugby union players
New Zealand female rugby sevens players
New Zealand women's international rugby sevens players
Rugby sevens players at the 2018 Summer Youth Olympics